Coen van Veenhuijsen (28 July 1886 – 8 December 1977) was a Dutch athlete. He competed in the men's pole vault at the 1908 Summer Olympics.

References

1886 births
1977 deaths
Athletes (track and field) at the 1908 Summer Olympics
Dutch male pole vaulters
Olympic athletes of the Netherlands
Sportspeople from Deventer